"Radetzky March", Op. 228, is a march composed by Johann Strauss Sr. and dedicated to Field Marshal Joseph Radetzky von Radetz. First performed on 31 August 1848 in Vienna, it soon became popular among regimented marching soldiers. It has been noted that its tone is more celebratory than martial; Strauss was commissioned to write the piece to commemorate Radetzky's victory at the Battle of Custoza.

Origin
Strauss had already used the theme in his Jubel-Quadrille, Op. 130; the upbeat bears a considerable resemblance to the second theme from the Allegro in Joseph Haydn's Symphony No. 100 composed in 1794. The rhythmic pattern—three anapaests, one iamb—has since then been popularised by numerous parody versions.

For the trio, Strauss used an older folk melody called Alter Tanz aus Wien or Tinerl-Lied (Tinerl was a contemporary Viennese songstress) which was originally in 3/4 time. When Radetzky came back to Vienna after winning the battle of Custoza (1848), his soldiers were singing the then-popular song. Allegedly Strauss heard this singing and incorporated the melody, converted to 2/4 time, into the Radetzky March.

Reception

Along with the Blue Danube waltz by Johann Strauss Jr., the piece became an unofficial Austrian national anthem. In 1932 Joseph Roth published his novel Radetzky March, chronicling the decline and fall of the Austro-Hungarian Empire. Today, the theme is used in numerous promotional jingles and at major sporting events, in particular at football matches of the Austrian national team. Since 1896, the Radetzky has been the official presentation march of the Chilean Army's Military School of the Liberator Bernardo O'Higgins and the Paraguayan Army's Marshall Francisco Solano López Military Academy. The 1st The Queen's Dragoon Guards of the United Kingdom adopted the Radetzky March as its regimental quick march.

When it was first played in front of Austrian officers, they spontaneously clapped and stamped their feet when they heard the chorus. This tradition, with quiet rhythmic clapping on the first iteration of the melody, followed by thunderous clapping on the second, is often observed when the march is played in classical music venues in an orchestral version prepared by Leopold Weninger (1879–1940). 

Since it was first introduced in 1946 by conductor Josef Krips during the New Year's Concert (Neujahrskonzert) of the Vienna Philharmonic it is always played as a jubilant encore. It was announced in 2019 by the Vienna Philharmonic board of directors that a new version would be used that would replace the Weninger arrangement in an attempt to "de-Nazify" the march. The new arrangement was first performed at the New Year's Concert in 2020.

Piece parts
The Radetzky March consists of three main parts:
The introduction: the whole orchestra plays and the brass section carries the melody.
The first figure: played by the string section.
At figure two: the whole orchestra plays until figure three, when it repeats back to the D.S. (first figure).
The trio: played by the brass section, with the trumpet playing three sixteenth notes in the last bars.
Figure five: the whole orchestra plays. 
Figure six: the whole orchestra plays and then repeats back to figure five.
The orchestra plays until the last bar, then returns to the D.C. (beginning).
The orchestra plays until figure three, finishing with the Fine ("end") bar— the direction is Da capo al fine (repeat from beginning up to the word Fine).

References

Bibliography 
 Jeroen H.C. Tempelman, "On the Radetzky March", Vienna Music, no. 99 (Summer 2000), pp. 12–13

External links 

 
Alter Tanz aus Wien, a Radetzkymarsch trio adaptation (sheet music)

Austrian military marches
1848 compositions
Compositions by Johann Strauss I
Compositions for symphony orchestra
Concert band pieces
Joseph Radetzky von Radetz